Grant Park may refer to:

United States
Grant Park, Atlanta, the oldest city park in Atlanta, Georgia, US
Grant Park, Bar Harbor, Maine
Grant Park (Chicago), a large urban park in Chicago, Illinois, US
Grant Park, Illinois, a village in Kankakee County, Illinois, US
Grant Park, Minneapolis, a building in Minneapolis, Minnesota, US
Grant Park, Portland, Oregon, both a neighbourhood and a public park in Portland, Oregon, US
Grant Park (Tampa), a neighbourhood in Tampa, Florida, US
Grant Park, Washington, D.C., a neighborhood in Washington, D.C., US

Elsewhere
Grant Park, a football ground in Lossiemouth, Scotland, home of Lossiemouth F.C.
Grant Park, Winnipeg, a neighbourhood in Manitoba, Canada
Grant Park Shopping Centre
Grant Park Music Festival
Grant Park Symphony Orchestra
Grant Park High School